Maureen Anne Kubinec  (born c. 1956) is a Canadian politician. She was born in Lacombe, Alberta. She was a member to the Legislative Assembly of Alberta representing the electoral district of Barrhead-Morinville-Westlock from 2012 until she lost her seat in the 2015 provincial election. She was appointed minister of culture and tourism in the government of Jim Prentice in 2014.

References

1950s births
Living people
Progressive Conservative Association of Alberta MLAs
Women MLAs in Alberta
Members of the Executive Council of Alberta
21st-century Canadian politicians
21st-century Canadian women politicians
Women government ministers of Canada